Carmont railway station, on the Aberdeen Railway, served the rural area of Carmont in Aberdeenshire, Scotland from 1855 to 1964.

History 
The station opened as New Mill Offset in September 1855 by the Caledonian Railway. The station was renamed to New Mill Siding in 1866, to Newmill in 1891 and finally Carmont in 1912. The station closed to passengers on 11 June 1956 and to goods traffic on 23 May 1964.

As of 2022, the signalbox, and adjacent crossover, remain in use.

The 12 August 2020 derailment, in which three people died, happened nearby, and was reported by a crew member at Carmont Signal Box.

References

External links 

Former Caledonian Railway stations
Railway stations in Great Britain opened in 1855
Railway stations in Great Britain closed in 1956
1855 establishments in Scotland
1964 disestablishments in Scotland